Kapalai is an island in Tawau Division, Sabah, Malaysia, known for its scuba resorts.

The island of Kapalai, just 15 kilometres off Sipadan, was a beautiful island two hundred years ago, but now remains as only a sand bar.  Erosion has reduced the island to sea level and the village now sits on the edge of the extensive Ligitan Reefs.  All of the buildings rest on stilts resting on the underwater reef. There is only one private resort on the island, with the rest of the island uninhabited.

Location
Kapalai is situated a couple of hours from the east coast of Borneo. Though the island is a relatively remote location to reach, there are daily flights from Kota Kinabalu, less than a one-hour flight from Tawau.

Transportation
As Kapalai Island is located off the east coast of Sabah / Borneo, Malaysia's easternmost state, direct flights are available to Tawau and Kota Kinabalu on Sabah from Kuala Lumpur on peninsular Malaysia and Singapore. The closest airport to Kapalai is Tawau, located approximately one hour from Semporna's jetty by minivan. Semporna's jetty serves as the speedboat departure point for Kapalai and the neighboring Sipadan Island and Mabul Island.

Kapalai Island is located to the northeast of Sipadan Island. Many tour operators provide roundtrip transfers from Tawau Airport to Semporna and onward to Kapalai Island.

Gallery

See also
 List of islands of Malaysia

References

External links
 Sipadan-Kapalai Resort official website
 Kapalai dive sites
 ICJ Press Release
 Photos of Kapalai Island

Islands of Sabah
Tourism in Sabah